Ammonium tetrathiomolybdate is the chemical compound with the formula (NH4)2MoS4. This bright red ammonium salt is an important reagent in the chemistry of molybdenum and has been used as a building block in bioinorganic chemistry. The thiometallate anion has the distinctive property of undergoing oxidation at the sulfur centers concomitant with reduction of the metal from Mo(VI) to Mo(IV).

Preparation and structure
The salt contains the tetrahedral [MoS4]2− anion. The compound is prepared by treating solutions of molybdate, [MoO4]2− with hydrogen sulfide in the presence of ammonia:
(NH4)2MoO4 + 4 H2S → (NH4)2MoS4 + 4 H2O

Reactions
The anion is also an excellent ligand. For example, with Ni(II) sources, it forms [Ni(MoS4)2]2−. Much of the chemistry of the thiomolybdate results from studies on salts of quaternised organic cations, such as [NEt4]2[MoS4] and [PPh4]2[MoS4] (Et = C2H5, Ph = C6H5). These organic salts are soluble in polar organic solvents such as acetonitrile and dmf.

The thermal decomposition of [NH4]2[MoS4] leads to molybdenum trisulfide (MoS3), ammonia (NH3) and hydrogen sulfide (H2S), beginning at 155 °C till 280 °C.

 (NH4)2MoS4 → MoS3 + 2 NH3 + H2S

MoS3 then decomposes again to molybdenum disulfide (MoS2) in a broad temperature range from 300 °C to 820 °C. Perfect decomposition to MoS2 under inert gas requires at least 800 °C according to the following reaction,

 MoS3 → MoS2 + S

but it can also be achieved at 450 °C, if there is enough hydrogen.

 MoS3 + H2 → MoS2 + H2S

Related compounds
Several related thio and seleno anions are known including (A = alkali metal cation, [PPh4]+, [NEt4]+)
A3[VS4]: 
A3[NbS4]
A3[TaS4]
A2[MoSe4]
A2[WS4]: , 
A2[WSe4]: , tetraethylammonium tetraselenotungstate
A[ReS4]
(C5H14NO)2MoS4 (bis-choline tetrathiomolybdate)
More complex tetrahedral anions include A2[MoS4−xOx] and A2[WS4−xOx]

Uses
Ammonium tetrathiomolybdate was first used therapeutically in the treatment of copper toxicosis in animals. It was then introduced as a treatment in Wilson's disease, a hereditary copper metabolism disorder, in humans; it acts both by competing with copper absorption in the bowel and by increasing excretion. Clinical studies have shown ATTM can effectively lower copper levels faster than currently available treatments, and that fewer patients with an initial neurological presentation of their disease who are treated with ATTM experience neurological deterioration 

Various phase II clinical trial of ATTM for copper depletion in cancer have been performed.

ATTM has also been found to have an inhibitory effect on angiogenesis, potentially via the inhibition of Cu ion dependent membrane translocation process involving a non-classical secretion pathway. This makes it an interesting investigatory treatment for cancer, age-related macular degeneration, and other diseases featuring excessive blood vessel deposition.

References

Molybdates
Sulfides
Ammonium compounds
Thiometallates